Kamel Habri (born March 5, 1976, in Tlemcen) is a retired Algerian international football player. He spent the majority of his career with his hometown club of WA Tlemcen. He also had 7 caps for the Algeria National Team and was a member of the team at the 1998 African Cup of Nations in Burkina Faso.

Club career
 1994-2000 WA Tlemcen 
 2000-2003 JSM Béjaïa 
 2003-2006 JS Kabylie 
 2006-2008 JSM Béjaïa 
 2008-2011 WA Tlemcen

Honours
 Won the Arab Champions League once with WA Tlemcen in 1998
 Won the Algerian Cup once with WA Tlemcen in 1998
 Won the Algerian League once with JS Kabylie in 2004
 Played in the 1998 African Cup of Nations in Burkina Faso
 Has 7 caps for the Algerian National Team

References

1976 births
1998 African Cup of Nations players
Algerian footballers
Algeria international footballers
Algerian Ligue Professionnelle 1 players
JS Kabylie players
JSM Béjaïa players
Living people
People from Tlemcen
WA Tlemcen players
Algeria under-23 international footballers
Association football defenders
21st-century Algerian people